The 1907 Dartmouth football team was an American football team that represented Dartmouth College as an independent during the 1907 college football season. In its first season under head coach John C. O'Connor, the team compiled an 8–0–1 record, shut out eight of nine opponents, and outscored all opponents by a total of 150 to 10. Quarterback John Glaze was the team captain. The team played its home games at Alumni Oval in Hanover, New Hampshire.

Schedule

References

Dartmouth
Dartmouth Big Green football seasons
College football undefeated seasons
Dartmouth football